Sondra London (born 1947 in Florida) is a controversial American true crime author. A onetime girlfriend of convicted murderer and suspected serial killer G.J. Schaefer and the fiancée of convicted serial killer Danny Rolling (later executed for his crimes), she interviewed both and published the results.

Writing
In a documentary by Errol Morris, London related how she first was inspired to write about crime after reaching a plateau in her career as a technical writer. She contacted the incarcerated serial killer G.J. Schaefer (an ex-cop doing two life sentences for murder, whom she had dated in high school) and the two began collaborating on a roman à clef book containing writings by Schaefer that were arguably descriptions of his own crimes. They released a collection of short stories entitled Killer Fiction. 

During this period the former deputy sheriff became increasingly obsessed with London and began divulging details of his crimes to her in prison visits and handwritten letters. London terminated the professional relationship with Schaefer after he threatened her life if she were to ever show authorities his incriminating letters. London went on to file these written threats and confessions with the court in defense of a lawsuit by Schaefer charging her with falsely stating Schaefer was a serial killer. Upon reading five hundred pages of Schaefer's handwritten statements attached to London's Response, the judge threw Schaefer's lawsuit out. After his death, Sondra London's sworn testimony was used to close two cold-case murders to Schaefer in the Ocala National Forest.

London collaborated with serial killer Danny Rolling in writing The Making of a Serial Killer: The Real Story of the Gainesville Murders, a psychological memoir which included Rolling's confessions to five murders, along with other capital crimes for which he had not been charged. The book was published by Feral House, and was illustrated by 50 pictures hand-drawn by Rolling in prison. The confessions were published in a three-part series appearing in the Globe. London and Rolling were sued by the State of Florida under a version of the Son of Sam law. Feral House published Sondra London's study of vampirism, True Vampires, in 2004. The book is illustrated by French killer Nicolas Claux.

In 2016, she published Good Little Soldiers: A Memoir of True Horror.

Television
In 2000, an episode of director Errol Morris' First Person television series centered on Sondra London. She has appeared on Dateline, Turning Point, Larry King Live, Geraldo, Leeza, A Current Affair, and Court TV in the United States; Channel 4 and BBC in UK; German and French cable, and Australian ABC.

AOL boycott
In September 1997, America Online (AOL) was threatened with a boycott due to London's website, "Serial Killers talk to Sondra London." Then-Governor of Wyoming Jim Geringer and child advocate Marc Klaas called for the boycott. They objected to the site which included writings of serial killers including Keith Hunter Jesperson who had been convicted of three killings in Oregon and was facing extradition to Wyoming in regard to another killing. AOL took down the site within hours. In October 1997, London was interviewed by Larry King on Larry King Live in regard to the website's removal in an episode dealing with the right of free speech. London said the site's information could help gain insight into the thinking of serial killers. One document included Jesperson's response to the question of why he killed people. Free speech advocates protested, and the website was restored.

References

External links

 
 

Living people
American non-fiction crime writers
New College of Florida alumni
Women crime writers
Discordians
American women non-fiction writers
1947 births
21st-century American women